No. 526 Squadron of the Royal Air Force was a British Second World War calibration and communications squadron.

History
No. 526 Squadron was formed on 15 June 1943 at RAF Longman, Inverness, Scotland from the calibration flights of Nos. 70, 71 and 72 Wing RAF to carry out calibration duties in northern Scotland. It had a mixture of mainly twin-engined aircraft, including the Bristol Blenheim and Airspeed Oxford. The squadron also operated the de Havilland Dominie and de Havilland Hornet Moth, which apart from calibration were also used for communications duties. The squadron was disbanded on 1 May 1945 when it was merged into 527 Squadron.

Aircraft operated

Squadron bases

References

Notes

Bibliography

External links
 Squadron history on MOD site
 Squadron histories for nos 52–540 squadron at RafWeb's Air of Authority – A History of RAF Organisation

No. 526
Military units and formations established in 1943
Military units and formations disestablished in 1945